Melampsora is a genus of Basidiomycota fungi. Melampsora species are plant pathogens.

Subtaxa
Melampsora contains the following species and formae speciales:

Melampsora abietis-canadensis 
Melampsora abietis-caprearum 
Melampsora abietis-populi 
Melampsora aecidioides 
Melampsora albertensis 
Melampsora allii-populina 
Melampsora americana 
Melampsora amygdalinae 
Melampsora apocyni 
Melampsora arctica 
Melampsora bigelowii 
Melampsora caprearum 
Melampsora chelidonii-pierotii 
Melampsora coleosporioides 
Melampsora epiphylla 
Melampsora epitea 
Melampsora euonymi-caprearum 
Melampsora euphorbiae 
Melampsora euphorbiae-gerardianae 
Melampsora ferrinii 
Melampsora gelmii 
Melampsora helioscopiae 
Melampsora hypericorum 
Melampsora idesiae 
Melampsora iranica 
Melampsora larici-epitea 
Melampsora larici-epitea f. sp. larici-daphnoides 
Melampsora larici-epitea f. sp. larici-epitea  
Melampsora larici-pentandrae 
Melampsora larici-populina 
Melampsora larici-tremulae 
Melampsora laricis 
Melampsora lini  - flax rust
Melampsora magnusiana 
Melampsora medusae 
Melampsora medusae f. sp. deltoidis 
Melampsora medusae f. sp. tremuloides  
Melampsora medusae-populina 
Melampsora microspora 
Melampsora nujiangensis 
Melampsora occidentalis 
Melampsora pakistanica 
Melampsora paradoxa 
Melampsora pinitorqua 
Melampsora populnea 
Melampsora populnea f. sp. laricis 
Melampsora populnea f. sp. pinitorqua  
Melampsora pruinosae 
Melampsora pulcherrima 
Melampsora repentis 
Melampsora reticulatae 
Melampsora ribesii-epitea 
Melampsora ribesii-purpureae 
Melampsora ribesii-viminalis 
Melampsora ricini 
Melampsora rostrupii 
Melampsora salicis-albae 
Melampsora vernalis 
Melampsora × columbiana 
Melampsora yezoensis

References

External links
 
 

Pucciniales
Fungal plant pathogens and diseases
Tree diseases